Testudinata is the group of all tetrapods with a true turtle shell. It includes both modern turtles (Testudines) and many of their extinct, shelled relatives (stem-turtles). Though it was first coined as the group containing turtles by Jacob Theodor Klein in 1760, it was first defined in the modern sense by Joyce and colleagues in 2004. Testudinata does not include the primitive stem-turtle Odontochelys, which only had the bottom half of a shell.
A recent phylogenetic tree of Testudinata included Angolachelonia and Testudines as sister-taxa and subgroups of Testudinata.

Classification
The cladogram below follows an analysis by Jérémy Anquetin in 2012.

References

 
Reptile taxonomy
Norian first appearances
Extant Late Triassic first appearances
Taxa named by Jacob Theodor Klein